Oliver Widmann (born 22 August 2001 in Ludwigsburg) is a German mountain bike trials cyclist who competes in the 26-inch category. He is a member of the national trials team "Bund Deutscher Radfahrer".

Career 
In November 2018 Widmann won the UCI Urban Cycling World Championships in the men junior trials 26-inch category. In 2019, he successfully defended his title. He also claimed the European and German champion titles in 2018 and 2019. At the UCI Urban Cycling World Championships 2018 he finished second with the German national team.

In the years 2015, 2016, and 2017 he became vice world champion at the UCI Trials World Youth Games in the 20-inch category.

2019

  UCI Urban Cycling World Championships - Trials 26“, Junior
  European Championships - Trials 26“, Junior
  German Championships - Trials 26“, Junior

2018

  UCI Urban Cycling World Championships - Team Trials
  UCI Urban Cycling World Championships - Trials 26“, Junior
  European Championships - Trials 26“, Junior
  German Championships - Trials 26“, Junior

References 

Living people
2001 births
German male cyclists
Mountain bike trials riders
European Games competitors for Germany
Cyclists from Baden-Württemberg
People from Ludwigsburg
Sportspeople from Stuttgart (region)
21st-century German people